Matiari is a city in Sindh, Pakistan.

Matiari may also refer to:
Matiari District, an administrative unit of Sindh, Pakistan
Matiari tehsil, in Matiari District, Pakistan
Matiari, Nadia, a census town in Nadia district, West Bengal, India

See also
 
 Matiaria, a village in Bihar, India
 Mateare, a municipality in Nicaragua